"With Just One Look in Your Eyes" is a song written by Stephen Allen Davis and Dennis Morgan, and recorded by American country music artists Charly McClain and Wayne Massey.  It was released in July 1985 as the second single from the album Radio Heart.  The song reached #5 on the Billboard Hot Country Singles & Tracks chart.

Chart performance

References

1985 singles
Charly McClain songs
Songs written by Dennis Morgan (songwriter)
Song recordings produced by Norro Wilson
Epic Records singles
Songs written by Stephen Allen Davis
1985 songs